Live:Highwayman is a 2005 blues album by Tinsley Ellis. It was recorded live at the Chord On Blues Blues Club in St. Charles, Illinois, by Timothy Powell for Metro Mobile Recording, mixed by Sam Fishkin and live performance location sound mixing by Ron Willhoff. It was mastered by Dan Stout and Bruce Iglauer and produced by Tinsley Ellis and Bruce Iglauer. Tinsley wrote or co-wrote seven of the songs on the album.

Track listing
 "To the Devil for a Dime"
 "Highwayman"
 "A Quitter Never Wins"
 "Real Bad Way"
 "Hell or High Water"
 "The Next Miss Wrong"
 "The Last Song"
 "Leavin' Here"
 "Pawnbroker"
 "The Axe"
 "Double Eyed Whammy"

Musicians
Tinsley Ellis on guitar and vocals
The Evil One on bass guitar and background vocals 
Jeff Burch on drums 
Todd Hamric on keyboards and background vocals

References

External links
Tinsley Ellis website

2005 albums
Tinsley Ellis albums